World Days or International Days observed at UNESCO designated by UN General Assembly for marking and commemorating "important aspects of human life and history".

January 
 10 January - World Hindi Day (विश्व हिन्दी दिवस)
 14 January - World Logic Day
 24 January - 
 International Day of Education
 World Day for African and Afrodescendant Culture
 27 January - International Day of Commemoration in Memory of the Victims of the Holocaust

February 

 11 February - International Day of Women and Girls in Science
 13 February - World Radio Day
 20 February - World Day of Social Justice
 21 February - International Mother Language Day

March 

 4 March - World Engineering Day for Sustainable Development
 8 March - International Women’s Day
 14 March - International Day of Mathematics
 20 March - International Francophonie Day
 21 March - 
 World Poetry Day
 International Day for the Elimination of Racial Discrimination
 International Day of Nowruz

 22 March - World Water Day

April 

 6 April - International Day of Sport for Development and Peace
 15 April - World Art Day
 23 April - World Book and Copyright Day
 30 April - International Jazz Day

May 

 3 May - World Press Freedom Day
 5 May -
 African World Heritage Day
 World Portuguese Language Day
 16 May - 
 International Day of Light
 International Day of Living Together in Peace
 21 May - World Day for Cultural Diversity for Dialogue and Development
 22 May - International Day for Biological Diversity

June 

 5 June - World Environment Day
 8 June - World Oceans Day
 17 June - World Day to Combat Desertification and Drought
 21 June - International Day of Yoga

July 
 18 July - Nelson Mandela International Day
 26 July - International Day for the Conservation of the Mangrove Ecosystem

August 

 9 August - International Day of the World's Indigenous People
 12 August - International Youth Day
 23 August - International Day for the Remembrance of the Slave Trade and its Abolition

September 

 8 September - International Literacy Day
 15 September - International Day of Democracy
 20 September - International Day of University Sport
 21 September - International Day of Peace
 28 September - International Day for the Universal Access to Information

October 

 5 October - World Teachers' Day
 11 October - International Day of the Girl Child
 13 October - International Day for Disaster Reduction
 17 October - International Day for the Eradication of Poverty
 24 October - United Nations Day
 27 October - World Day for Audiovisual Heritage

November 

 First Thursday - International Day Against Violence and Bullying at School, including Cyberbullying
 2 November - International Day to End Impunity for Crimes against Journalists 
 5 November - 
 World Day of Romani Language
 World Tsunami Awareness Day
 10 November - World Science Day for Peace and Development
 Third Thursday in November - World Philosophy Day
 14 November - International Day against Illicit Trafficking in Cultural Property
 16 November - International Day for Tolerance
 25 November - International Day for the Elimination of Violence against Women
 26 November - World Olive Tree Day
 29 November - International Day of Solidarity with the Palestinian People

December 

 1 December - World AIDS Day
 3 December - International Day of Persons with Disabilities
 10 December - Human Rights Day
 18 December -
 International Migrants Day
 World Arabic Language Day

See also

 List of environmental dates
 List of food days
 Lists of holidays
 List of holidays by country

References

External links 

 International Days
 National Health Observances (NHO), United States
 UK awareness days calendar
 United Nations Observances Calendar
 UNESCO International Days

Calendars
United Nations days
Lists of observances
Lists of days